Zaid Jaber (born January 6, 1991) is a Jordanian football player who plays as a defender for Al-Salt.

International goals

With U-19

References

External links

1991 births
Association football midfielders
Jordanian footballers
Jordan international footballers
Jordan youth international footballers
Living people
Suwaiq Club players
Shabab Al-Ordon Club players
Muaither SC players
Al-Yarmouk FC (Jordan) players
Al-Ahli SC (Amman) players
Al-Jazeera (Jordan) players
East Riffa Club players
Al-Ahli Club (Manama) players
Al-Hussein SC (Irbid) players
Al-Salt SC players
Jordanian Pro League players
Oman Professional League players
Bahraini Premier League players
Qatari Second Division players
Expatriate footballers in Oman
Jordanian expatriate sportspeople in Oman
Expatriate footballers in Bahrain
Jordanian expatriate sportspeople in Bahrain
Expatriate footballers in Qatar
Jordanian expatriate sportspeople in Qatar
Jordanian expatriate footballers
Footballers at the 2010 Asian Games
Asian Games competitors for Jordan